Karel Hašler (31 October 1879 in Prague – 22 December 1941 in Mauthausen) was a Czech songwriter, actor, lyricist, film and theatre director, composer, writer, dramatist, screenwriter and cabaretier. He was murdered in the Mauthausen concentration camp.

Biography 
Hašler studied to be a glove-maker, but he became intererested in theatre at a young age and occasionally performed with amateur theatre ensembles. In 1897, following his debut at the Aréna Theatre he left home and successively joined various travelling theatre companies. In 1902 he became a member of the Slovenian theatre in Ljubljana, but soon moved back to Prague, where he joined the National Theatre ensemble. In the National Theatre, he asserted himself in conversational plays. In addition to that, he also attempted to apply his singing abilities. Around 1908, he started composing his own music, and at the same time he began to incline to cabaret activities. Gradually he became a director and head of various Prague cabarets, such as Lucerna (1910–1915, 1918–1923), Rokoko (1915–1918) and Karlín Variety Theatre (1924–1929). In 1908, he married a sister of pianist and composer Rudolf Friml.

During World War I he also began to appear in silent films, as an actor, director and author. In 1914, he made a comedy České hrady a zámky (Czech Castles), based on his own script. The film was intended as an introduction for the play Pán bez kvartýru (A Man Without Flat). He appeared also in the comedy 
Ahasver and in other silent films. 

Among his most successful film roles were the lawyer and deputy Uher in the drama film Batalion (The Battalion, 1927) by Přemysl Pražský, and the organist in Varhaník u sv. Víta (Organist at St. Vitus Cathedral, 1929) by Martin Frič. The coming era of the sound film in 1930s enabled Hašler to utilize his singing skills. In his first sound film role Písničkář (Balladeer, 1932) by Svatopluk Innemann he sang patriotic songs Svoboda (Freedom) and Ta naše písnička česká (Our Czech song), among others. In 1942, in his last film role, he played himself in Za tichých nocí (In the Quiet Nights), made by his son Gina Hašler. From 1932 to 1941 Hašler played in more than 13 films. In September 1941, during production of the film Městečko na dlani, based on the script by Jan Drda, he was arrested by the Gestapo and sent to the Mauthausen concentration camp. The main reason for his arrest was his patriotic songs. On 22 December 1941 the Germans poured water on him and left him outside in the December frost to get frozen like an ice sculpture.

In the post-war Communist Czechoslovakia he was officially ignored for political reasons, because many of his songs hailed Tomáš Masaryk and Czechoslovak Legionnaires and mocked interbellum communists, and also because he was an admirer of the founder of the National Fascist Community Radola Gajda, and ideologically was close to the interbellum Czech fascists.

Remembrance

A popular Czech herbal-menthol hard candy was called  after him. They have been known since early 1900s. Now the trademark is owned by Nestle.

"Hašlerky" is a recognizable type of songs, written by Hašler and of similar character.

Czech astronomer Lenka Kotková (née L. Šarounová) named asteroid 37939 Hašler after him.

In 2008, Czech directors Marek Jícha and Josef Lustig made a documentary Písničkář, který nezemřel (The Immortal Balladeer of Prague) describing the fate of Hašler's illegitimate son Thomas Hasler.

In 2013 the band Patrola Šlapeto recorded a CD and DVD with 23 Hašler's songs based on original recordings found in musical archives. While there have been plenty recordings of Hasler's songs, this was the first in 80 years recording of the original tunes.

Karel Hašlers artistic output consists mainly of songs. He created more than 300 compositions, many of which became popular "folk songs". With his engaged patriotic approach he helped to strengthen the national consciousness of Czech people during times of danger and oppression. Following his death in the concentration camp, his songs became a symbol of national resistance.

Works
Selected songs
 Hoši od Zborova
 Kampak na nás, bolševíci? (1919)
 Po starých zámeckých schodech
 Pětatřicátníci
 Ta naše písnička česká
 Čí je Praha? Naše!
 Já mám holku od Odkolků
 Strahováček
 Podskalák

Actor:
 Pantáta Bezoušek (The Old Man Bezousek, 1941) – Councillor Burdych
 Roztomilý člověk (A Charming Man, 1941) – Editor-in-chief
 In the Still of the Night (1941) – Karel Hašler
 Jarní písnička (Spring Song, 1937) – Chodec
 Vzdušné torpédo 48 (Air Torpedo 48, 1936) – Dr Marvan
 Ať žije nebožtík (Long Live with Dearly Departed, 1935) – Petr Kornel
 Jedenácté přikázání (The Eleventh Commandment, 1935) – The Police Captain
 Král ulice (King of the Street, 1935) – Martin Antoni/Martin
 Za ranních červánků (1934) – Josef Dobrovský
 Srdce za písničku (A Heart for a Song, 1933) – Hugo Strindberg
 Záhada modrého pokoje (Mystery of a Blue Room, 1933) – Count Hellford
 Jindra, hraběnka Ostrovínová (Jindra, the Countess Ostrovín, 1933) – Musician Jahoda
 Písničkář (Balladeer, 1932) – Pavel Hala
 Do You Know That Little House on Lake Michigan? (1929) – Kennedy
 Adjunkt Vrba (Adjunct Vrba, 1929) – Maran
 Varhaník u sv. Víta (Organist at St. Vitus Cathedral, 1929) – Organist
 Batalion (Battalion, 1927) – JUDr. František Uher
 Falešná kočička (The Little False Cat, 1926) – MUDr. Karel Verner
 Cikán Jura (Gypsy Jura, 1922)
 Ahasver (1915) – Painter's Husband Valentin
 České hrady a zámky (Czech Castles and Palaces, 1914) .... Karel Hašler

Writer:
 Babička (Grandmother, 1940)
 Hordubalové (1938)
 Švanda dudák (1937) – screenplay
 Irčin románek (Irca's Romance, 1936) – screenplay
 Vojnarka (1936) – screenplay
 Vzdušné torpédo 48 (Air Torpedo 48, 1936)
 Jánošík (1935)
 Král ulice (King of Street, 1935) – screenplay
 Za ranních červánků (1934) – screenplay
 Záhada modrého pokoje (1933) – screenplay
 V tom domečku pod Emauzy (In the Little House Below Emausy, 1933)
 Písničkář (Balladeer, 1932) (screenplay)
 České hrady a zámky (Czech Castles and Palaces, 1914) – story

Composer:
 Venoušek a Stázička (1939)
 Neporažená armáda (Undefeated Army, 1938)
 Jana (1935)
 Jedenácté přikázání (The Eleventh Commandment, 1935)
 Král ulice (1935)
 Poslední muž (1934)
 Srdce za písničku (A Heart for a Song, 1933)
 U snědeného krámu (The Ruined Shopkeeper, 1933)
 Záhada modrého pokoje (1933)
 Písničkář (1932)

Music Department:
 Rote Rosen – blaue Adria (1938) – composer: song "Rote Rosen – Blaue Adria", "O du mein alter Stephansturm ..."
 Jarní písnička (Spring Song, 1937) – composer: song "Ta naše krásná zem je jako pohádka"
 Divoch (Wild Girl, 1936) – composer: song "Pod oblohou modré Adrie"
 Za ranních červánků (1934) – composer: song "Ty šumavské hory"
 Matka Kráčmerka (Mother Kracmerka, 1934) – composer: song "Valčík"
 Jindra, hrabenka Ostrovínová (Jindra, the Countess Ostrovín, 1933) – composer: song "My nikdy svoji nebudem"

Director:
 Irčin románek (Irca's Romance, 1936)
 Srdce za písničku (A Heart for a Song, 1933)
 České hrady a zámky (Czech Castles and Palaces, 1914)

Soundtrack:
 Za tichých nocí (In the Still of the Night, 1941) – music: "Po starých zámeckých schodech"

Producer:

 Jánošík (1935)

Notes

References

External links 

Karel Hašler and Jaromír Vejvoda – Commenius Project
Czech Radio – Magazine (2004)
The Immortal Balladeer of Prague – Fangango.com

1879 births
1941 deaths
Male actors from Prague
People from the Kingdom of Bohemia
Czech male stage actors
Czech male film actors
Czech male silent film actors
20th-century Czech male actors
Czech songwriters
Czech screenwriters
Male screenwriters
20th-century Czech dramatists and playwrights
Czech male dramatists and playwrights
Czech film directors
20th-century Czech male singers
Czechoslovak civilians killed in World War II
People who died in Mauthausen concentration camp
People executed by torture
Czech people executed in Nazi concentration camps
Musicians from Prague
20th-century screenwriters
Czechoslovak male singers